Rocc (born Rok Rappl, 14 December 1979 in Ljubljana) is a Slovenian-born opera stage director, scenic designer, dramaturge, performance artist, opera manager and pedagogue.

Biography
He was granted a scholarship by the Ministry of Culture of the Republic of Slovenia, as well as receiving support from the Slovenian Academy of Sciences and Arts.

Rocc has staged more than 60 opera productions at the opera houses in Ljubljana, Prague, Brno, Ostrava, Riga, Wrocław, at the Grieg Hall and the National Theatre in Bergen, at the Ljubljana's Cankar Centre and elsewhere. His projects have been presented at several international festivals, such as ISCM World Music Days, Ljubljana Festival, Bergen International Festival, Prague Quadrennial, OPERA Festival in Prague, Janáček Brno Festival, Exposition of New Music Festival in Brno,  project in the Czech Republic, Warsaw Autumn Festival of Contemporary Music, Audio Art Festival in Kraków, Festival of Sacred Music in Pordenone, Day of the Composer in the Netherlands. Rocc has a special affinity for contemporary opera combining alternative sound, performing and installation arts, new media and site-specific projects. Since 2013 he has been the initiator and Artistic Director of Concept operapovera, an ensemble focused on contemporary and experimental music-theatre aesthetics.

In the 2007/2008 season Rocc held the post of Dramaturge of the Slovenian National Opera in Maribor. The 2008/2009 season saw him as Deputy Artistic Director and Dramaturge of the Janáček Opera of the National Theatre Brno, in 2009–2011 he was Artistic Director of the Janáček Opera and a member of the Programme Board of the International Janáček Brno Festival. In 2011–2013 he was Artistic Director of the Prague State Opera, which has been affiliated with the National Opera in Prague since 2012. In 2013–2019 he was Artistic Director of the Slovenian National Opera in his hometown Ljubljana.

Rocc is also active as a pedagogue of opera stage directing and opera acting and as a member of professional juries.

Recognitions
 2018 Recognition for important works of art, the highest artistic title of the University of Ljubljana, which is equivalent to the scientific title of Doctor of Science
 2020 Recognition of the Mayor of the Municipality of Litija on the occasion of the 20th anniversary of artistic activities

Productions
 1999 Giovanni Battista Pergolesi: La serva padrona, Janáček Academy in Brno (Chamber Opera)
 2002 Alessandro Scarlatti: L'amor generoso, Janáček Academy in Brno (Chamber Opera)
 2003 Ernst Toch: Die Prinzessin auf der Erbse, National Opera Ljubljana
 2004 Josef Berg: , Janáček Academy in Brno (Studio 09)
 2004 Josef Berg: , Janáček Academy in Brno (Studio 09)
 2004 Markéta Dvořáková & :  (world premiere), National Theatre Prague (Estates Theatre)
 2005 Vít Zouhar: The Days of the Nights (world premiere), National Theatre Brno (Reduta Theatre)
 2007 Tomáš Hanzlík: Lacrimae Alexandri Magni (world premiere), National Theatre Prague (Estates Theatre)
 2008 Philip Glass: La Belle et la Bête, National Theatre Brno (Reduta Theatre)
 2008 Michal Košut: Macbeth (world premiere), Brno International Music Festival (Reduta Theatre)
 2009 Joseph Haydn: Lo speziale, National Opera Ljubljana & Ljubljana Festival (Ljubljana Castle – open-air)
 2010 Gioachino Rossini: La Cenerentola, National Theatre Brno (Mahen Theatre)
 2010 Leoš Janáček: Šárka, National Theatre Ostrava
 2010 Bohuslav Martinů: Ariane, National Theatre Ostrava
 2010 : The Swineherd (world premiere), National Opera Ljubljana & Cankar Centre (Linhart Hall)
 2011 Vít Zouhar & Tomáš Hanzlík: La Dafne (world premiere), National Theatre Brno (Reduta Theatre)
 2011 Pietro Mascagni: Cavalleria rusticana, Opera Bergen (Bergenhus Fortress – open-air)
 2011 Giacomo Puccini: Le Villi, Opera Bergen (Bergenhus Fortress – open-air)
 2012 Richard Strauss: Elektra, National Theatre Brno (Janáček Theatre)
 2012 Sergei Rachmaninoff: The Miserly Knight, Opera Bergen (Den Nationale Scene)
 2012 Giacomo Puccini: Gianni Schicchi, Opera Bergen (Den Nationale Scene)
 2012 Claude Debussy: Pelléas et Mélisande, National Theatre Prague
 2013 Benjamin Britten: Let's Make an Opera! The Little Sweep, National Opera Riga
 2013 Richard Wagner: Lohengrin, National Theatre Ostrava
 2013 Giacomo Puccini: La bohème, Opera Bergen (Markusplassen – open-air)
 2014  & Markéta Dvořáková:  (world premiere), National Theatre Brno (Reduta Theatre)
 2014 Giacomo Puccini: Gianni Schicchi, Opera Bergen (Bergenhus Fortress – open-air)
 2014 Ruggero Leoncavallo: Pagliacci, Opera Bergen (Bergenhus Fortress – open-air)
 2014 Andrew Yin Svoboda: Martin Středa, operapovera (Janáček Academy in Brno - Chamber Hall)
 2015 : The Tenth Daughter (world premiere), National Opera Ljubljana
 2015 Vít Zouhar & Rocc: Echo–Metamorphoses I (opera-installation, world premiere), operapovera & PQ 2015 (Czech Museum of Music in Prague)
 2015 Georges Bizet: Carmen, Opera Bergen (Bergenhus Fortress – open-air)
 2015 Grigory Frid: The Diary of Anne Frank, National Opera Ljubljana (Stage -3)
 2015 Grigory Frid: The Diary of Anne Frank, Opera Bergen & operapovera (Den Nationale Scene – Little Stage)
 2016 Gioachino Rossini: Il barbiere di Siviglia, Opera Bergen & Bergen International Festival (Den Nationale Scene)
 2016 Edvard Grieg: Haugtussa, operapovera & Janáček Brno Festival (Orlí Theatre)
 2016 Leoš Janáček: The Diary of One Who Disappeared, operapovera & Janáček Brno Festival (Orlí Theatre)
 2017 Ludwig van Beethoven: Fidelio, National Opera Ljubljana & Wrocław Opera
 2017 Vít Zouhar & Rocc: Echo–Metamorphoses II (opera-ambient, world premiere), operapovera (Czech Museum of Music in Prague)
 2018 Georges Bizet: Les pêcheurs de perles, Opera Bergen (Sentralbadet)
 2018 Ana Sokolović: Love Songs, Slovenian Chamber Music Theatre & operapovera (The Old Power Station in Ljubljana)
 2018 Emil Viklický: The Ploughman and Death, Festival Opera Schrattenbach in Olomouc (Hus Congregational House)
 2019 : code L (world premiere), National Opera Ljubljana
 2019 Giuseppe Verdi: La traviata, Opera Bergen (Grieg Hall)
 2019 Vít Zouhar & Rocc: Echo–Metamorphoses III (Gardens of Life, world premiere), PQ 2019 & operapovera (Exhibition Grounds Prague)
 2019 Johann Heinrich Schmelzer: Le veglie ossequiose, Olomouc Baroque Festival (Theatrum Schrattenbach)
 2019 Johann Heinrich Schmelzer: Die sieben Alter stimmen zusammen, Olomouc Baroque Festival (Theatrum Schrattenbach)
 2019 Wolfgang Amadeus Mozart: Così fan tutte, Opera Bergen (University Aula in Bergen)
 2019 Sára Medková, Vít Zouhar,  & Carmina Escobar: MarISHA (world premiere), Festival Meetings of New Music Plus in Brno (Orlí Theatre)
 2020 Aleš Makovac: Julija (world premiere), Janez Trdina Cultural Centre in Novo mesto
 2020 Giacomo Puccini: Madama Butterfly, Opera Bergen (Bergenhus Fortress – open-air)
 2020 Stephen McNeff: Beyond the Garden (world premiere), Slovenian Chamber Music Theatre, operapovera & Cankar Centre (Štih Hall)
 2021 : The Little Match Girl (world premiere), Slovenian Chamber Music Theatre (The Old Power Station in Ljubljana)
 2021 Carl Ditters von Dittersdorf: Il Davide, Festival Hortus Magicus Kroměříž (Kroměříž Castle – open-air) & Olomouc Baroque Festival (The Holy Hill)
 2021 Igor Stravinsky: Apollon musagète & Oedipus rex, National Opera Ljubljana
 2021 , Sára Medková & Vít Zouhar: TiAmo (world premiere), Audio Art Festival in Kraków (Academy of Music in Kraków – Concert Hall)
 2022 Georg Friederich Händel: Agrippina, Academy of Music in Ljubljana & Cankar Centre (Linhart Hall)
 2022 Bedřich Smetana: The Two Widows, National Theatre Ostrava
 2022 Petra Strahovnik: BallerinaBallerina (world premiere), Ensemble Modelo62 (Theater De Vaillant in The Hague)
 2022 Ruggero Leoncavallo: Pagliacci, Opera Bergen (Grieg Hall)
 2022 , Sára Medková & Vít Zouhar: Sara'smile (world premiere), Exposition of New Music Festival in Brno (Orlí Theatre)
 2022 Dan Dlouhý, Michal Indrák, Martin Švec, Kristýna Švihálková & : ONI (world premiere), Festival Meetings of New Music Plus in Brno (Orlí Theatre)
 2022 David Ryan, Vít Zouhar & Rocc: I-ME (world premiere), Slovenian Chamber Music Theatre (Atrium of the City Museum of Ljubljana)
 2023 Viktor Ullmann: , National Theatre Ostrava & National Theatre Prague (Estates Theatre)
 2023 Viktor Ullmann: Der Kaiser von Atlantis, National Theatre Ostrava & National Theatre Prague (Estates Theatre)

References

External links
 Rocc's official website
 
 

1979 births
Living people
Opera directors
Opera designers
Opera managers
Artistic directors
Slovenian theatre directors
Theatre people from Ljubljana
Czech opera directors